Buster and Billie is a 1974 American neo noir crime film motion picture released by Columbia Pictures. The film was of the tragic romance/revenge film genres. It was directed by Daniel Petrie, whose credits include films such as Fort Apache, The Bronx (1981).

In the title roles were future Airwolf star Jan-Michael Vincent as Buster, and Joan Goodfellow as Billie. In supporting roles, Buster and Billie also featured Pamela Sue Martin of Dynasty fame as Buster's girlfriend Margie, and Robert Englund, in his film debut, who later shot to fame in the Nightmare on Elm Street film series as Freddy Krueger, in a small role as Buster's friend, Whitey.

This film is also notable as one of the earliest American mainstream movies to have male frontal nudity. Much of the movie was filmed in the towns of Metter and Register, Georgia, as well as in surrounding rural areas. Townspeople were excited the movie was being filmed and were unaware of the movie's risque plot or nudity.

Plot
In a small Georgia town in 1948, Buster Lane (Jan-Michael Vincent) is a handsome, popular high-school senior, who is engaged to be married to his pretty, popular high-school sweetheart Margie Hooks (Pamela Sue Martin). He is the 'big man on campus' and the leader of his group of friends.

Buster's friends often visit a girl from an underprivileged background named Billie-Jo Truluck (Joan Goodfellow), who dourly gives them the sexual favors they want. Meanwhile, Buster becomes disenchanted with Margie's refusal to have sex with him, and begins seeing Billie in secret.

At first he sees Billie just for sex but eventually finds himself falling in love with her. He becomes, in fact, so taken with Billie that he breaks off his engagement with Margie and starts appearing in public with Billie, who finds a new lease on life with Buster. They are happy for the first time in their lives. Happiness for them, though, is short-lived.

Buster's friends are extremely jealous that they cannot have Billie for their own use anymore and corner her  when they are drunk and find her out walking. When she refuses to submit to them, they rape and kill her in the heat of the moment. Buster eventually finds her dead, and is hysterical. He then goes to the pool hall where his friends are, with the guilt evident on the faces of the main perpetrators of the crime.

Enraged, Buster kills two of them, while injuring the other two. He is put into jail for this, but is released on bail the day after her funeral, which no one attends except his parents. He rips up a truckload of flowers from garden beds in the town, and takes these flowers to Billie's graveside.

Cast
 Jan-Michael Vincent as Buster Lane
 Pamela Sue Martin as Margie Hooks
 Clifton James as Jake
 Robert Englund as Whitey
 Joan Goodfellow as Billie 
 Jessie Lee Fulton as Mrs. Lane
 J.B. Joiner as Mr. Lane
 Dell C. Payne as Warren
 Mark Pendergraft as Mole
 David Paul Dean as Phil
 David Little as Smitty
 Vernon Beatty as Arland
 Doris Pearce as Mrs. Hooks 
 Carl Reddick as Mr. Hooks
 Dale Pearce as Sally
 Lewell Akins as Photographer
 Mentoria Sills as Hat Lady
 Bruce Atkins as Sheriff 
 John Chappell as Deputy
 Bob Hannah as Bus Driver (as Robert E. Hannah)
 Aaron Swain as Principal
 Quincy O. Waters as Minister 
 Joyce Woodrum as Mrs. Trulove
 Jim Shirah as Mr. Trulove
 Slim Mims as himself
 Claude Casey as himself
 The Sagedusters as Themselves

Critical reception
Roger Ebert awarded the film three (out of four) stars and wrote, "The movie’s no masterpiece, but it’s an affecting story well told, it observes its teen-age characters with a fine insight, and it almost earns its tragic ending." Lawrence Van Gelder of The New York Times stated that the film "is at once an alluring and fiercely disappointing movie that leaves one full of regret for what might have been," its chief flaw being that the characters were "types, observed keenly but unexplained, remote rather than real, remembered, but not revealed." Gene Siskel of the Chicago Tribune gave the film two stars out of four and wrote that it "crudely imitates 'The Last Picture Show'," adding, "Worse than having an implausible story line, 'Buster and Billie' makes no attempt to justify it. I can understand why Buster might leave his steady girl — she's a clothes-conscious drip — but the matchup with the emotionally troubled Billie is never justified, except as a vehicle for wringing our hearts. Contributing to the film's failure, and leaving a bad taste in our mouths, is yet another cataclysmic movie conclusion in which various acts of cruelty are performed and people die. After wallowing in forced kindness, 'Buster and Billie' concludes with forced horror."  Variety criticized the ending as "hysterical, synthetic and implausible melodrama which skirts meaningful resolution. Even so, Turbeville and Petrie nicely etch social behavior in post-World War II rural America. The largely unknown cast performs with beguiling authenticity, and there are many incidental observations that transcend facile nostalgia." Charles Champlin of the Los Angeles Times called it "an assemblage of ingredients previously identified as crowd-pleasers" with "little life of its own—almost nothing of that feeling, which for all its craft 'American Graffiti' certainly had, that its creators were looking back at someplace they'd been." Gary Arnold of The Washington Post wrote that the film started out as "a pungent and authentic story," but once it turns dark "takes a rather precipitous header, going the way of gratuitously violent exploitation. The change in direction is extremely unattractive and ill-advised, and it may ruin the film's initially strong chances of popularity."

Leonard Maltin gave the film a *1/2 score, and said that it was a "blubbery account of high school romance in 1948 rural Georgia...[and that it] can't overcome cliched premise." Steven Scheuer said that it was "an uneven but perceptive film" and that, in the lead roles, Vincent played his role "with strength and charm" while Goodfellow was "touching as the acquiescent town tramp."

Music
The film's title song "Billie's Theme" is sung over the opening and closing credits by Hoyt Axton. A re-recorded version appeared on Axton's "Life Machine" album the same year of the film's release.

See also
 List of American films of 1974

References

External links
 
 
 

1970s coming-of-age drama films
1974 crime drama films
1974 films
1974 romantic drama films
American coming-of-age drama films
American crime drama films
American romantic drama films
American teen drama films
Columbia Pictures films
Fictional duos
Films directed by Daniel Petrie
Films set in 1948
Films set in Georgia (U.S. state)
Films shot in Georgia (U.S. state)
1970s English-language films
1970s American films